Hell Fire is a 2015 independent horror film that was written, directed, and co-produced by Marc Fratto.

Synopsis
When a group of prostitutes decide to rob their pimp's house, they're unaware that their actions will put them face to face with the Antichrist.

Cast
J. Scott Green	as The Antichrist
Katelyn Marie Marshall	as Justine D'Neapolis / Fyre
Selene Beretta	as Rosetta
Jennice Carter	as Shanice Holden / Destinee
Kasey Williams	as Phoebe Foster / Cinnamon
Ray Chao as Tony 'Tiny' Wang
Jodi Mara as Anna Wang
Shashone Lambert as Marisol
Joshua Nelson as Baby Daddy
Chris Davis as Gabriel 'Dark Gable' James
Mindy Wedner as Kasey D'Neapolis / Butterfly
Xavier Rodney as Shawn
Gaetano Iacono as Nick
Tyrone Miller as Shawn's Bodyguard
James E. Smith as Dr. Bill

Reception
Critical reception was mixed during the film's limited release Fangoria and Ain't It Cool News both praised Hell Fire, and Fangoria wrote "Out of its mind and bloody as heck, it’s a jolt of adrenaline into the veins of the grassroots horror scene." HorrorNews.net in their rev that while the acting "wasn't great" that the plot was "solid" and that the actors did "show passion of their roles". Yell Magazine's Shawn Loeffler called it a "generally an all-around B movie," with strong effects and realistic dialogue.

References

External links
 

2012 films
2012 horror films
American independent films
American supernatural horror films
Fictional depictions of the Antichrist
2010s English-language films
2010s American films